Gerard (Gerry) Hanberry  is an Irish poet. He also writes non-fiction and is an accomplished musician, singer, guitarist and songwriter.  He lives in Galway, Ireland.

Life and career

Gerard Hanberry has published four collections of poetry to date and also two non-fiction books. His biography of the Wilde family, More Lives Than One - The Remarkable Wilde Family Through the Generations (Collins Press, 2011) tells the story of this remarkable family from their earlies times to the present day. His second non-fiction book explores the women who inspired some of Ireland's great love songs, 'On Raglan Road - Great Irish Love Songs and the Women Who Inspired Them' (Collins Press /Gills 2016). Hanberry was invited by RTE to come on board as writer and researcher on their recent programme 'Search for Ireland's Best Loves Folk Song'.  Gerard's most recent poetry collection is 'What Our Shoes Say About Us' published by Salmon Poetry in July 2014 and includes the poem 'Embers' which won the prestigious Brendan Kennelly Award. This followed the collection 'At Grattan Road' published by Salmon Poetry in 2009. Paul Perry, reviewing the collection 'At Grattan Road' for the Irish Times, said it was "bursting at the seams with fine poems". Hanberry's first collection, Rough Night, was published in 2002 by Stonebridge Publications, Wales. This was followed in 2005 by Something Like Lovers, also from Stonebridge Publications. 

Hanberry's poetry has been published widely in many literary journals and newspapers in Ireland and further afield and his poems have also been included in various anthologies including 'Windharp -Poems of Ireland Since 1916' published by Penguin in 2016. He has been shortlisted for many of Ireland's top poetry prizes, including a Sunday Tribune/Hennessy Award in 2000, Strokestown Prize 2003 and RTÉ’s Rattlebag Poetry Slam 2003. He won the Galway City and Co. Council's Poetry Award for National Poetry Day 2009. In 2000 he won the Originals Short Story prize in Listowel Writers' Week. An early draft of his biography of Oscar Wilde and his extraordinary family More Lives Than One was shortlisted for the Kingston University Non-Fiction Prize. He has been invited to read and deliver workshops and talks at many literature festivals and has been broadcast on Ireland's RTE, Lyric FM, Galway Bay FM, Newstalk, Midwest Radio and other local stations as was as Cape Cod Radio in the US and various stations in Australia. His poems have appeared on Dublin's Dart, the Irish equivalent of Poems on the Underground and a stone plaque of his poem 'The Kasbah on Quay Street' was erected on Quay Street during the Cuirt Literary Festival in 2016. Hanberry's work has been translated into various languages including Italian and Croatian and in March 2016 Italian poetry magazine 'Poesia' included eighteen of his poems in a major feature article. Non fiction articles have been published in various journals and an exploration of Oscar Wilde's ancestry was published in the 'History and Society' series on Roscommon. He was invited to speak to the Oscar Wilde Society on Oxford.

Gerard (Gerry) Hanberry holds an MA in Writing from the National University of Ireland, Galway, where he teaches a Creative Writing course to undergraduates. He worked in journalism during the 1980s and 1990s, writing a weekly column for the Galway Observer under the name "Joe Barry". He also worked as a secondary school teacher for many years In addition he performs regularly as a solo singer/guitarist/ songwriter. He runs occasional creative writing and poetry appreciation workshops and delivers talks on his non-fiction works around the country including a show 'On Raglan Road' which includes live performances of a selection of songs from his book of the same name and an illustrated talk on the women who inspired some of Ireland's great love songs such as 'Grace', 'Nancy Spain', 'The Voyage' etc. 
See his Facebook pages Gerry Hanberry for more details and contact Gerry through Facebook messenger. A website www.gerardhanberry.com for more information.

Bibliography
 'On Raglan Road - Great Irish Love Songs and the Women who Inspired Them' - The Collins Press [2016]
 More Lives Than One - The Remarkable Wilde Family Through the Generations - The Collins Press, Sept. [2011]
 Rough Night, Stonebridge Publications, May 2002
 Something Like Lovers, Stonebridge Publications, October 2005
 At Grattan Road, Salmon Poetry, 2009
 'What Our Shoes Say About Us', (Salmon Poetry, 2014)

References

 North Beach Nights in the Galway Advertiser, 15 October 2009.

External links
 Gerard Hanberry's Official Website
 Gerard Hanberry at the Collins Press Website
 At Grattan Road page at Salmon Poetry and 'What Our Shoes Say About Us' page  at Salmon Poetry
 Eyre Square Poetry Competition winner, Galway Advertiser, 8 October 2009.
Gerard Hanberry is on Facebook and his two non-fiction books also have Facebook pages.

1955 births
Living people
Academics of the University of Galway
Alumni of the University of Galway
Irish poets
People from County Galway
Musicians from County Galway
Irish non-fiction writers